Jeff Fields (born July 3, 1967) is a former professional football player who played two games as a defensive tackle with the National Football League's Carolina Panthers. Originally drafted by the Los Angeles Rams in the 1991 NFL Draft, Fields did not appear in an NFL game until 1995 with the expansion Panthers. He had played in the Canadian Football League from 1991 to 1994. In two games with the Panthers, Fields did not earn any statistics.

References
 http://www.nfl.com/players/profile?id=FIE697551

1967 births
Living people
African-American players of American football
African-American players of Canadian football
American football defensive tackles
Canadian football defensive linemen
Arkansas State Red Wolves football players
Hamilton Tiger-Cats players
Toronto Argonauts players
Carolina Panthers players
Players of American football from Jackson, Mississippi
Players of Canadian football from Jackson, Mississippi
21st-century African-American people
20th-century African-American sportspeople